Lake Upsilon is a lake in Rolette County, North Dakota, in the United States.

This lake was so named on account of its shape, upsilon meaning Y in Greek.

See also
List of lakes in North Dakota

References

Lakes of North Dakota
Bodies of water of Rolette County, North Dakota